Thom Monahan is an American producer/engineer and musician who is best known for his work with the bands Pernice Brothers, Fruit Bats and Vetiver. He has also produced albums by Devendra Banhart, Wild Nothing, Beachwood Sparks, and the Chris Robinson Brotherhood.

Biography
Thom Monahan was the bassist and singer of Connecticut indie-rock band Monsterland from 1991 to 1994, the bassist for Lilys from 1995 to 1998, and a member of the Pernice Brothers from 1998 to 2005. He began his recording career in 1995 with the Scud Mountain Boys' debut album, Dance The Night Away. When Scuds singer Joe Pernice formed Pernice Brothers in 1998, Monahan was enlisted to play bass, provide background vocals and produce the band's debut album, Overcome by Happiness. He went on to produce additional Pernice Brothers albums The World Won't End, Yours, Mine and Ours and Discover a Lovelier You.

Monahan moved from his native New England to California in 2005 and began working with bands in the San Francisco folk scene, recording many albums in Sacramento's The Hangar studio, including Devendra Banhart's Cripple Crow and Vetiver's To Find Me Gone, Thing of the Past and Tight Knit. At his home studio in Los Angeles, he has recorded albums by Chris Robinson Brotherhood, Fruit Bats, Vetiver, Fujiya & Miyagi, Little Joy and Papercuts. Music from the 2010 film Ceremony was also recorded at Monahan's space.

As a co-producer, Monahan and Black Crowes singer Chris Robinson worked on Vagabonds, the first solo album by Jayhawks singer Gary Louris, which features vocals by Jenny Lewis, Susanna Hoffs and Jonathan Wilson. Monahan also co-produced the Sarah Lee Guthrie & Johnny Irion album Bright Examples with Andy Cabic.

In 2012, Monahan collaborated with Fujiya & Miyagi on a remix of the Moebius & Plank track, "Conditionierer," which was featured on Who's That Man – A Tribute To Conny Plank. The same year, he mixed a cover of Betty Davis' "If I'm in Luck I Might Get Picked Up" by Iggy Pop and Zig Zags, which was featured in a series issued by Light in the Attic Records.

As an engineer and mixer, Monahan is credited on albums by Neko Case, Bedouine and Nina Persson.

Songs produced by Monahan have appeared on such television shows as Weeds, Parenthood, Skins, Grey's Anatomy, and Entourage. The Peter, Bjorn and John song "If I Was A Spy," used in the children's show Yo Gabba Gabba!, was engineered and mixed by Monahan.

Monahan married journalist and author Shirley Halperin in 2004.

Select discography
see also albums by Pernice Brothers.

1995
Scud Mountain Boys – Dance the Night Away

1996
The Lilys – Better Can't Make Your Life Better
New Radiant Storm King – Hurricane Necklace
Scud Mountain Boys – Massachusetts
Silver Jews – The Natural Bridge

1997
The Lilys – Services (For The Soon To Be Departed)

1998
Pernice Brothers – Overcome by Happiness

1999
Purple Ivy Shadows – White Electric

2000
Joe Pernice – Big Tobacco
Chappaquiddick Skyline – Chappaquiddick Skyline
J Mascis + The Fog – More Light
The Capitol Years – Meet Yr Acres
Lo Fine – Nine

2001
The Chamber Strings – Month of Sundays
Beachwood Sparks – Once We Were Trees
Pernice Brothers – The World Won't End

2002
New Radiant Storm King – Winter's Kill
The Bigger Lovers – Honey in the Hive
J Mascis + The Fog – Free So Free

2003
Pernice Brothers – Yours, Mine and Ours
The Natural History – Beat Beat Heartbeat 		  	
Dave Derby – Even Further Behind
The Capitol Years – Jewelry Store

2004
Vetiver – Vetiver
Tussle – Kling Klang

2005
Devendra Banhart – Cripple Crow
Pernice Brothers – Discover a Lovelier You
The Capitol Years – Let Them Drink
 National Eye – Roomful of Lions
 Lori Meyers – Hostal Pimodan

2006
Vetiver – To Find Me Gone	
Brightblack Morning Light – Brightblack Morning Light
The Rosewood Thieves – From the Decker House

2007
Devendra Banhart – Love Above All
Lavender Diamond – Imagine Our Love
Matt pond pa – If You Want Blood
The Rosewood Thieves – Lonesome
Pop Levi – Return to Form Black Magick Party
Brad Laner – Neighbor Singing

2008
Vetiver – More of the Past
Gary Louris – Vagabonds
Chapin Sisters – Lake Bottom LP 	  	
Little Joy – Little Joy
The Broken West – Now or Heaven
The Whispertown2000 – Swim
The Rosewood Thieves – Rise & Shine

2009
Vetiver – Tight Knit
Au Revoir Simone – Still Night, Still Light
Geva Alon – Get Closer
Jason Lytle – Yours Truly, the Commuter

2010
The Brother Kite – Isolation
Johnny Irion and Sarah Lee Guthrie – Bright Examples
Brad Laner – Natural Selections

2011
Vetiver – The Errant Charm	
Papercuts – Fading Parade
Ever Isles – Cocoon
Geva Alon – In the Morning Light
Neal Casal – Sweeten the Distance
Jonathan Wilson – Gentle Spirit
Mary Epworth – Dream Life
Fujiya & Miyagi – Ventriloquizzing
Fruit Bats – Tripper

2012
Chris Robinson Brotherhood – Big Moon Ritual, The Magic Door
Beachwood Sparks – The Tarnished Gold
Night Moves – Colored Emotions
Sera Cahoone – Deer Creek Canyon
He's My Brother She's My Sister – Nobody Dances in This Town

2013
Blake Hazard – The Eleanor Islands
Medicine – To the Happy Few

2014
Chris Robinson Brotherhood – Phosphorescent Harvest
Nina Persson – Animal Heart
Geppetto & the Whales – Heads of Woe
Horse Thief – Fear in Bliss
Henry Wolfe

2015
Wild Nothing – Life of Pause
Vetiver – Complete Strangers
EDJ – EDJ
Astropol – The Spin We're In
Buxton – Half a Native
The Donkeys – Midnight Palms
Peter Bjorn and John – TBD
Psychic Ills – Inner Journey Out
Mary Epworth – Elytral
Blake Hazard – Possibilities at Sea

2016
Liv – Wings of Love
Fruit Bats – Absolute Loser

2017
Bedouine – Bedouine
Dave Depper – Emotional Freedom Technique
Eyelids – Or

2018
Neko Case – Hell-On
Meg Baird and Mary Lattimore – Ghost Forests
Buxton – Stay Out Late

References

External links
Mix Magazine interview

Year of birth missing (living people)
Living people
Record producers from California
American audio engineers
Lilys members